Charlotte "Lotti" Tschanz (born 10 July 1933) is a Swiss former archer who represented Switzerland in archery.

Career 

Tschanz competed in the 1980 Summer Olympic Games in the women's individual event and finished eighth with a score of 2346 points.

References

External links 

 Profile on worldarchery.org

1933 births
Living people
Swiss female archers
Olympic archers of Switzerland
Archers at the 1980 Summer Olympics